Variable charge X-linked protein 1 is a protein that in humans is encoded by the VCX gene.

This gene belongs to the VCX/Y gene family, which has multiple members on both X and Y chromosomes, and all are expressed exclusively in male germ cells. The X-linked members are clustered on chromosome Xp22 and Y-linked members are two identical copies of the gene within a palindromic region on Yq11. The family members share a high degree of sequence identity, with the exception that a 30-bp unit is tandemly repeated in X-linked members but occurs only once in Y-linked members. The VCX gene cluster is polymorphic in terms of copy number; different individuals may have a different number of VCX genes. VCX/Y genes encode small and highly charged proteins of unknown function. The presence of a putative bipartite nuclear localization signal suggests that VCX/Y members are nuclear proteins. This gene contains 10 repeats of the 30-bp unit.

References

Further reading